Jig dolls are traditional wooden or tin-plate toys for adults or children. They are dolls with loose limbs that step dance or 'jig' on the end of a vibrating board or platform in imitation of a real step dancer. In London they were frequently operated by street entertainers or buskers. In England old soldiers from the Great War sometimes busked with them to supplement their meagre war pensions. Today, jig dolls of one kind or another can be seen in the United States, Canada, the UK, Ireland, Europe, parts of Asia, and Australia.

Alternative names
In the UK and Australia, a jig doll usually goes by that name, or any of the following: dancing doll; busker's puppet; clogger; jigger; Mr. Jollyboy or Mrs. Jollyboy (a commercial version made by Dover Toys, UK), etc. A Mr Jollyboy is in the collection of the Norwich Museum.

In the USA, a jig doll would be called a limberjack or limberjill or limbertoy; paddle puppet; stick puppet. A commercial version was called: Dancing Dan or Dancin' Dan; Dapper Dan; Dancing Jo or Dancin' Jo; Stepping Sam or Steppin' Sam, etc.

In French-speaking parts of Canada they are referred to as les gigueux.

In one old patent the term Manipulable Doll was used.

History
Dancing dolls have been popular street entertainment for hundreds of years. They are thought to have been brought to England from Italy as early as the sixteenth century; such older versions were known as Poupées à la Planchette or Marionettes à la Planchette. These puppets, operated by a horizontal string attached to the musician's leg, 'danced' on a board on the ground as the musician tapped his foot. They were, and still are, popular street entertainment throughout Europe.

At some stage, possibly in the mid-19th century, the string was replaced by a wooden rod fixed into the back of the body, or attached to a wire loop on the top of the doll's head, with the doll dancing on a vibrating board. Later, some jig dolls were automated.

The East Anglian Traditional Music Trust (EATMT) reports that the earliest jig doll yet discovered is one from the Victorian Great Exhibition at The Crystal Palace dating from 1851. A female figure, dressed in a skirt, petticoat, bodice and shawl, it is now in the Cliffe Castle Museum, Keighley, Yorkshire."

Old ones have become collectors' items and can fetch high prices. Some antique clockwork tin-plate 'jiggers' can fetch anything up to £2,000 (in 2009).

Traditional English folk singers and musicians sometimes made their own jig dolls, such as Harry Cox, Billy Bennington and Walter Pardon, all of whom were from Norfolk (East Anglia). The first Norfolk Jig Doll Convention was held in 2016 in tribute to Harry Cox. Jig dolls seem to have survived better in East Anglia than other parts of the country; the EATMT has commissioned a collection of them.

Variations on the theme
Jig dolls are essentially home-made toys. Typical versions could represent sailors, male and/or female costumed folk-dancers, African-Americans, Native Americans, Morris dancers, Punch and Judy, Adolf Hitler, even animals such as frogs, horses, chickens, dogs, and cows, etc. They may be clothed, painted or left as bare polished wood. Sometimes the heads are whittled to show distinctive facial features. Historical figures such as Harry Lauder and more recent ones such as John Major (dancing on a board bearing an image of Margaret Thatcher) have been made.

Some Punch and Judy Professors also use jig dolls to attract a crowd. One has a jig doll of Charlie Chaplin. In the UK, some folk dance bands have a jig doll to entertain the audience in the interval of a barn dance. Such dolls may occasionally appear at live traditional music sessions in English pubs (in the past, step dancing by members of the audience would have been a common feature of such a pub session).

In Québec and French-speaking Canada, jig dolls can feature as a percussion instrument for a folk dance band, even to the extent of the plank on which a doll 'dances' being fitted with a small microphone connected to the PA system.

References

Bibliography
 Exner, Carol R.; Practical Puppetry A-Z: A Guide for Librarians and Teachers; McFarland & Co. (31 December 2004) 
 Pickles, Pat; Howson, Katie; The Brightest of Entertainers: Jig Jolls from Britain and Beyond; East Anglian Traditional Music Trust (13 August 2018)

Films
 Appalachian Journey (1990). Recorded and directed by Alan Lomax. Features short clips of homemade limberjacks and several examples of the type of step dancing that they imitate

External links
 Jig Doll Duet – a clip of a performance by Val Knight (one of the few collectors of jig dolls in the UK) at the Reading Cloggies' Festival in 1983. The musician is the late Simon Knight (requires RealPlayer)
 Singabout #58 – Jig Dolls. An article by David Johnson, originally published in Singabout #58, December 1986, p51, published by The Bush Music Club Inc., Sydney, Australia
 Cafe Fantastique featuring Elwood Donnelly playing several different limberjacks
 Hoosier Hotcakes A video featuring Mitch Rice playing and singing "Shoo Fly Pie" while accompanied by his wife Eileen playing a dog-shaped limberjack

English folklore
Puppets
Traditional toys
Appalachian culture
Wooden dolls